"¡Happy Birthday Guadalupe!" is a Christmas song by Las Vegas rock band The Killers featuring Wild Light and Mariachi El Bronx, released as a digital download on December 1, 2009.

The song continues on with The Killers' tradition of releasing a Christmas song every year, and is the fourth consecutive annual Christmas song since 2006, the others being "A Great Big Sled", "Don't Shoot Me Santa" and "Joseph, Better You Than Me". All proceeds from the Christmas singles benefit the Product Red campaign.

Music video
A music video, starring Luke Perry, was released for the song on December 1, 2009. In it, Perry is a cowboy searching the desert for his long-lost love, a woman named Guadalupe.

Track listing
CD Single
 "¡Happy Birthday Guadalupe!" - 4:33

Charts

In popular culture
The song appears in the film Christmas Eve.

References

2009 singles
2009 songs
American Christmas songs
Christmas charity singles
Island Records singles
Male vocal duets
Song recordings produced by Stuart Price
Songs written by Brandon Flowers
Songs written by Dave Keuning
Songs written by Mark Stoermer
Songs written by Ronnie Vannucci Jr.
The Killers songs